Rosette (real name Françoise Quéré; born 6 September 1959) is a French actress and producer.

Roles 
 Immoral Women (1979)
 Pauline at the Beach (1983)
 The Green Ray (1986)
 A Tale of Winter (1992) : Irma
 The Lady and the Duke (2001)
 Let's Dance (2007)
 Diary of a Chambermaid (2015)

Short films by Rosette
 Anniversaires (1997) with Isild Le Besco
 Les amis de Ninon (1998) with Isild Le Besco

Production company 

 Rosette sort le soir (1983) with Arielle Dombasle
 Rosette prend sa douche (1984) with Arielle Dombasle
 Rosette vend des roses (1985) with Virginie Thévenet and Pascale Ogier
 Rosette cherche une chambre (1987) with Virginie Thévenet and Amanda Langlet

External links
 
 Rosette production company on imdb.co

1959 births
Living people
People from Cherbourg-Octeville
French film actresses
French television actresses
20th-century French actresses
21st-century French actresses
French film directors
French women film directors
French women screenwriters
French screenwriters
French film producers
French women film producers